Camberwell was a civil parish and metropolitan borough in south London, England. Camberwell was an ancient parish in the county of Surrey, governed by an administrative vestry from 1674. The parish was included in the area of responsibility of the Metropolitan Board of Works in 1855 and became part of the County of London in 1889. The parish of Camberwell became a metropolitan borough in 1900, following the London Government Act 1899, with the parish vestry replaced by a borough council. In 1965 the borough was abolished and its former area became part of the London Borough of Southwark in Greater London.

Geography
The original parish of Camberwell St Giles had three divisions. They were the Liberty of Peckham to the east, the Hamlet of Dulwich to the southwest and the central division of Camberwell proper. The liberty of Peckham stretched from north of Old Kent Road to Honor Oak, taking in Peckham and Nunhead. Camberwell stretched from what is now Burgess Park in the north to what is now the Horniman Museum in the south, taking in the central Camberwell area around Camberwell Green, the eastern part of Herne Hill and East Dulwich. It included a long protrusion in the west, surrounded by Lambeth, as far as what is now Myatt's Fields Park. The hamlet of Dulwich stretched from Champion Hill in the north to what is now Crystal Palace in the south, taking in Dulwich Village, West Dulwich and Sydenham Hill.

In 1900 the Camberwell/Lambeth boundary was tidied up with an exchange of population (approximately 6,000 each way) which had the effect of transferring Myatt's Fields Park to Lambeth.

Ecclesiastical parishes 
The ancient parish, dedicated to St Giles, was in the Diocese of Winchester until 1877, then the Diocese of Rochester until 1905, and then finally in the Diocese of Southwark. From 1825, as the population of Camberwell increased, a number of new parishes were formed:
 St George, Camberwell In 1825	
 Christ Church, Old Kent Road In 1838
 Emmanuel, Camberwell In 1842
 St Mary Magdalene, Peckham In 1842
 Camden Chapel, Camberwell In 1844
 St Matthew, Denmark Hill In 1848
 St Chrysostom, Peckham In 1865
 St John the Evangelist, East Dulwich In 1865
 St Andrew, Peckham In 1866	
 St Peter, Dulwich Common In 1867 
 St Stephen, South Dulwich In 1868
 All Saints, Blenheim Grove, Peckham In 1872
 St James, Knatchbull Road, Camberwell In 1874
 St Antony (formerly St Antholin), Nunhead In 1878 
 St Luke, Rosemary Road, Peckham In 1878
 St Jude, Peckham In 1880
 St Saviour, Denmark Park In 1881
 St Mark, Peckham In 1884
 St Clement, East Dulwich In 1886
 St Batholemew, South Bermondsey In 1887
 All Saints, North Peckham In 1892
 St Barnabas, Dulwich In 1894
 St Silas, Nunhead In 1895 

In addition, as the population of neighbouring areas increased, parts of Camberwell parish were included in new parishes:
 St Paul, Herne Hill In 1845  with parts of St Mary, Lambeth
 St Philip, Avondale Square In 1876  with parts of St Anne, Bermondsey
 St Mark, Camberwell In 1880  with parts of All Saints, Newington

Coat of arms

The corporation was granted arms in 1901. The shield depicted the main areas of the borough. In the first and fourth quarter was a well, for Camberwell. The second quarter was for Dulwich: the chevron and cinquefoils from the arms of Edward Alleyn, founder of Alleyn's School. The third quarter represented Peckham: the lion was from the arms of Robert, Earl of Gloucester, one time lord of the manor.

The crest depicted a wounded hart, symbol of St Giles, patron saint of Camberwell.

In 1927 the borough was additionally granted an heraldic badge and standard. The badge depicted a Camberwell beauty butterfly.

Politics

Under the Metropolis Management Act 1855 any parish that exceeded 2,000 ratepayers was to be divided into wards; as such the incorporated vestry of St Giles Camberwell was divided into six wards (electing vestrymen): No. 1 or St George's West (12), No. 2 or St George's East (12), No. 3 or Camden (12), No. 4 or North Peckham (15), No. 5 or South Peckham (15) and No. 6 or Camberwell & Dulwich (18).

In 1894 as its population had increased the incorporated vestry was re-divided into eight wards (electing vestrymen): St George's West (15), St George's East (12), Camden (12), North Peckham (21), South Peckham (21), North Dulwich (15), Central Dulwich (12) and South Dulwich (12).

The metropolitan borough was divided into twenty wards for elections: Addington, Alleyn, Clifton, Coburg, Goldsmith, Lyndhurst, Marlborough, North Peckham, Nunhead, Ruskin, Rye Lane, St George's, St Giles, St John's, St Mary's, The College, The Hamlet, The Rye, The West and Town Hall.

Borough council
From 1900 to 1934 the borough was controlled by the Municipal Reform Party (allied to the Conservatives). In 1934 the Labour Party gained control, which they retained until abolition in 1965.

Parliament constituency
For elections to Parliament, the borough was divided into three 
constituencies:
Camberwell, Dulwich
Camberwell, North
Camberwell, Peckham

In 1918 the borough's representation was increased to four seats:
Camberwell, Dulwich
Camberwell, North
Camberwell, North-West
Camberwell, Peckham

In 1950 the number of seats was halved to 2:
Camberwell, Dulwich
Camberwell, Peckham

Population and area
The population, as recorded at the census, was:

Camberwell Vestry 1801–1899

Metropolitan Borough 1900–1961

References

Further reading

External links
A Vision of Britain

Metropolitan boroughs of the County of London
History of the London Borough of Southwark
Parishes governed by vestries (Metropolis)
1900 establishments in the United Kingdom
1965 disestablishments in the United Kingdom
Metropolitan Borough of
Districts abolished by the London Government Act 1963